SAPS may refer to:

Science and technology
 SAPS II (Simplified Acute Physiology Score), a severity of disease classification system
 SAPS III (Simplified Acute Physiology Score), a system for predicting mortality
 Stand-alone power system, where electrical power is generated and consumed off-grid
 Scale for the Assessment of Positive Symptoms, a rating scale to measure positive symptoms in schizophrenia

Other uses
 South African Police Service, the national police force of the Republic of South Africa

See also
 SAP (disambiguation)
 Sap (disambiguation)